Nathaniel Polhill  (1723–1782) was a British merchant and politician who sat in the House of Commons from 1774 to 1782.
 
Polhill was the eldest son of William Polhill of Burwash, Sussex and his wife Hannah Lade, daughter of Stephen Lade of Downham, Norfolk, and was born on 7 January 1723. He married  Elizabeth Coppard, daughter of William Coppard of Hastings  on 5 March 1750. Polhill was a tobacconist at Southwark. From 1777 he was a partner in a City bank.

At the 1774 general election Polhill stood for Southwark,  promising economic and parliamentary reform. He was returned as Member of Parliament after heading the poll. In  the 1780 general election  he was again returned for Southwark after a contest. He was a leading member of the Protestant Association, and his only reported speech in Parliament was in seconding Lord George Gordon’s motion on the Association's petition.

Polhill died on 29 August 1782, leaving estates in five counties.

References

1723 births
1782 deaths
British merchants
British bankers
British MPs 1774–1780
British MPs 1780–1784
Members of the Parliament of Great Britain for English constituencies